The Ekkofestival, Ekko or Ekko - Bergen Electronic Music and Art Festival, is a music festival which takes place in Bergen, Norway in the fall every year.

Biography 
Ekko mainly focus on presenting electronic music and contemporary art, where the musical expressions encompasses a multitude of genres, with electronic music as the common denominator. The festival started in 2003, and it has grown substantially since the beginning.

During the years Ekko has presented over 400 artists and/or bands, and Ekko has been early in fronting many new artists. Artists like Skatebård, Jeans Team, Me At Sea, Annie, Booka Shade and Kleerup have all played at the festival, as well as established musicians like ESG, Puma, Lasse Marhaug, Biosphere, Stian Westerhus, Øystein Moen, Susanne Sundfør, and A Certain Ratio.

In 2009 the festival started the 24th and ended 26 September, and the venue is USF Verftet in Bergen. The line-up includes artists / bands like Röyksopp, Efterklang, Karin Park, Woolfy, The Field, Jonathan Johansson and many more. In addition the festival will present an extended visual art-program.

Bands and artists (in selection) 

2010 (15–23 October)
 Casiokids
 Kim Hiorthøy
 Moderat
 Lo-Fi-Fnk
 Vinnie Who

2011 (29 September – 1 October)
 Pierre Henry
 The Wombats
 Bjørn Torske
 Planningtorock
 Robert Henke
 White (Stian Westerhus & Øystein Moen) feat. Susanne Sundfør

2012 (22 October – 3 November)
 Todd Terje
 El Perro del Mar
 John Talabot
 GusGus
 Stian Westerhus
 Bjørn Torske

2013 (25 October – 2 November)
 Pantha Du Prince & The Bell Laboratory
 Holly Herndon
 Andrew Weatherall
 Jon Hopkins
 Lindstrøm
 Mykki Blanco
 Andrew Weatherall
 Vessels

2014 (17–25 October)
 Nils Frahm
 Future Brown
 The Haxan Cloak
 Shackleton

2015 (28–31 October)

See also 

List of electronic music festivals

References

External links 

Puma feat. Lasse Marhaug, Ekko Festival, Bergen 2007. on YouTube

Music festivals established in 2003
Festivals in Bergen
Music in Bergen
Electronic music festivals in Norway
2003 establishments in Norway
Autumn events in Norway